Samuel Kozlovský (born 19 January 1999) is a Slovak professional footballer who plays as a defender for Fortuna Liga club AS Trenčín.

Club career

AS Trenčín
Kozlovský made his Fortuna Liga debut for AS Trenčín in an away fixture against ViOn Zlaté Moravce on 23 September 2021. He was featured in the starting XI and completed the entire 1:0 victory, secured by Samuel Lavrinčík's late debut league goal.

References

External links
 AS Trenčín official club profile 
 Futbalnet profile 
 
 

1999 births
Living people
Footballers from Bratislava
Slovak footballers
Slovakia youth international footballers
Association football defenders
ŠK Slovan Bratislava players
FC Petržalka players
AS Trenčín players
2. Liga (Slovakia) players
Slovak Super Liga players